Provincial Trunk Highway 16 (PTH 16) is a provincial highway in the Canadian province of Manitoba. It is the Manitoba section of the Yellowhead Highway, and also the Trans-Canada Highway Yellowhead section. The main purpose of this highway is to connect Winnipeg with other Canadian cities such as Saskatoon and Edmonton.

The highway is two lanes through Manitoba, with two small divided sections at the north and south junctions with PTH 10 around Minnedosa, which it runs in concurrence with just west of the town. PTH 16 is also twinned as it passes through Russell in concurrence with PTH 83, with northbound PTH 83 leaving/entering the concurrence at the western end of this section. 

Twinning and upgrading to expressway status is being planned in the future.

Alternate routes 
Minnedosa - Highway 16A

History 

The route was known as  PTH 4 until 1977, when it was renumbered to allow the entire length of the Yellowhead Highway to retain the number 16 designation across all four provinces of western Canada.

Between 1966 and 1979, PTH 16 was the designation of the route connecting Fisher Branch to PTH 7 near Fraserwood. This route became part of PR 231 and PR 228 in 1977. (This section of PR 228 would be transferred to PTH 17 in 1983).

The highway has had some reconfigurations in its time. When the highway first appeared on the 1928 Manitoba Highway Map, the highway's eastern terminus with PTH 1 was located in Portage la Prairie. From Portage la Prairie, the road traveled north following the current PR 240 to Mile 71N (formerly PR 249). The highway would then turn west and rejoin its current configuration just south of Macdonald. The junction was moved to its current location in 1950, and the old section was designated as PTH 4A between 1953 and 1965.

In the Minnedosa area, the section of highway from PTH 16A and PR 262 to Franklin Road (formerly PR 466 north) was constructed and opened to traffic in 1948. Prior to this, the highway turned north for two kilometres and then west past the hamlet of Franklin to Minnedosa, meeting PTH 10 south at the town limits. It then shared the highway to a point three kilometres north of its current junction with PTH 10 north at what is now the turnoff to the Ski Valley Recreation Area. PTH 4 would then turn west and rejoin the current configuration just east of Basswood.
The current section of PTH 16 between its current northbound/westbound junction with PTH 10 and Basswood was constructed and opened to traffic in 1953.

After these reconfigurations, PTH 4 met southbound PTH 10 two kilometres south of Minnedosa and then shared the highway through the town along what is now PTH 16A to its current northbound/westbound junction. The highway was extended two kilometres farther west in 1971 to its current junction with southbound PTH 10 with the construction of the Minnedosa bypass.

The current section between Shoal Lake and the southbound junction of PTH 83 was constructed and opened to traffic in 1958. Prior to this, PTH 4 would meet PTH 21 in Shoal Lake (northbound PTH 21 ended at this point). The highway would continue west along what is now PTH 42 to meet PTH 83 south at Birtle. The two highways would then run in concurrence from Birtle to the current junction seven kilometres east of Foxwarren, where it would then rejoin its current configuration.

Prior to 1990, PTH 16 used to be cosigned with PTH 1 between its junction west of Portage La Prairie and Winnipeg;
however, when the Yellowhead Highway was incorporated as part of the Trans-Canada Highway, the PTH 16 designation was dropped in favour of the current unnumbered designation.

Major intersections

References

!colspan=3| Yellowhead Highway
|-
|width="30%" style="text-align: center;"|Previous province:Saskatchewan
|width="30%" style="text-align: center;"|Manitoba
|width="30%" style="text-align: center;"|Next province:Terminus

016
Manitoba 016
Yellowhead Highway